Hellgate is a 1989 horror film directed by William A. Levey, written by Michael S. O'Rourke, and starring Ron Palillo, Abigail Wolcott, and Carel Trichardt. It follows two young couples who become embroiled in the mystery of a desolate ghost town, Hellgate, where a young woman was kidnapped and murdered by a biker gang in 1959. It was released in the United States directly-to-video in August 1990 through Vidmark Entertainment.

Plot
College students Pam, her best friend Bobby, and Chuck are awaiting the arrival of Bobby's boyfriend Matt at a remote cabin in the Sierra Nevada mountains. Bobby tells the story of the Hellgate hitchhiker, an urban legend about a spectral female hitchhiker alleged to be the ghost of a woman, Josie Carlyle, the daughter of a mining magnate who was kidnapped by a biker gang in 1959 and brutally murdered in the now-ghost town of Hellgate, where her father served as mayor. After Josie's murder, a gold mining prospector uncovered a strange crystal in an abandoned mine, which he brought to her father, Lucas. Lucas, distraught over Josie's death, used the crystal's powers to reanimate her corpse, inadvertently wreaking supernatural havoc on anything that came in contact with it.

Meanwhile, Matt stops at the same diner from where Josie was abducted years prior, seeking directions from a waitress there. He subsequently encounters Josie on the road and offers her a ride, unaware she is a ghost. The two drive through Hellgate, which appears populated by a number of ghostly figures meandering in a trancelike state. Matt drives Josie off at her dilapidated father's mansion, where he is invited inside. Josie seduces Matt, but he is frightened away by Lucas, armed with the crystal, and flees.

Upon arriving at the cabin, Matt explains to Bobby his encounter with Josie. That night, Matt, Bobby, and Pam visit the local diner for coffee. In an abandoned car shop next-door, they find a newspaper article detailing the disappearance of Buzz, the leader of the biker gang, after Josie's disappearance. They are then attacked by Zonk, a boorish mechanic, who warns them against returning to Hellgate. Matt, Bobby, Pam, and Chuck drive to Hellgate to investigate despite Zonk's warnings, and find Josie's grave in the local cemetery. They are met by a series of ghostly individuals in town, and witness Josie naked in a dance hall, where several lone couples dance. 

In the cemetery, Lucas invokes the powers of the crystal to bring the various deceased residents of Hellgate back to life, and they begin to attack Matt, Pam, Chuck, and Bobby. Bobby and Chuck return to the car, but are confronted by Lucas, who decapitates Chuck. In a saloon, Bobby witnesses a ghostly pianist. Matt and Pam arrive moments later and find a stunned Bobby. Matt and Pam leave to get help, as Bobby refuses to go back outside. Alone in the saloon, Bobby watches in disbelief as a vaudeville show is put on by the ghosts before Lucas strangles her, turning her into one of the undead.

Meanwhile, Matt and Pam go to the Carlyle mansion in search of a telephone, but the call is cut short when Matt reaches the police station. Josie appears and lures Matt upstairs and again seduces him, before Pam arrives and shoots Josie with a rifle, causing her to fall from a window. Matt and Pam flee, where they are met by Bobby and Chuck in their Jeep, both now apparent zombies. Matt and Pam manage to escape in Josie's vintage car, only to find Lucas clinging to the top. Lucas attempts to attack them with the crystal, but Matt crashes into a building, throwing him from the vehicle, after which a building collapses on him. Matt and Pam flee the town. Meanwhile, Josie wanders through the streets of Hellgate.

Cast

Production
Director William A. Levey had previously filmed Committed starring Jennifer O'Neill and Ron Palillo in South Africa, which led to his hiring as director for Hellgate, another South African-based production. The film was shot in a real abandoned town in South Africa with a cast largely made up of South African actors. Levey initially planned to cast Embeth Davidtz in one of the lead female roles, but ultimatley chose not to hire her as she was unable to speak with a convincing American accent at the time. Abigail Wolcott, a model who was touring Europe and South Africa, was discovered by Levey and cast as Josie. Ron Palillo, who had previously starred in Levey's Committed and Skatetown, U.S.A., was given the lead role of Matt.

Release

Home media
Hellgate was distributed on home video by New World Pictures in the United Kingdom in December 1989. It was released in the United States directly-to-video in August 1990 through Vidmark Entertainment, as well as on LaserDisc.

In 2014, Arrow Video released a limited edition Blu-ray in the United Kingdom.

Critical response
Andrew Smith of Popcorn Pictures gave the film an abysmal score of 1/10, writing, "Hellgate isn’t just bad, it’s on the same ‘utterly terrible’ plane of existence as the likes of Troll and Raging Sharks. It's not a film you can even watch if you're curious about how awful it is. Just forget it ever existed." Michael Weldon in The Psychotronic Video Guide gave the film a negative review, noting: "Ron Palillo (from Welcome Back, Kotter), who was nearly 40 at the time, stars in this awful, irritating teen horror movie."

Graeme Clark from The Spinning Image awarded the film 1/10 stars, calling it "utter garbage" and criticized the film's script, phony special effects, and acting.

See also
 List of horror films of 1989

References

Sources

External links

 
 

1989 films
1989 horror films
American comedy horror films
American splatter films
American supernatural horror films
American zombie films
South African comedy horror films
1980s English-language films
English-language South African films
Films set in California
Films set in ghost towns
Films shot in South Africa
New World Pictures films
Surrealist films
1980s comedy horror films
1989 comedy films
1980s American films